Most Guys Are Losers is a 2020 American comedy-drama film written and directed by Eric Ustian and starring Andy Buckley and Mira Sorvino.  It is based on the novel of the same name by Mark Berzins.

Cast
Andy Buckley as Mark
Mira Sorvino as Amy
Michael Provost as Bo
Grace Fulton as Sandy
Keith David as Al
Paul Sorvino as Grandpa
Belmont Cameli as Trevor
Maryelizabeth O'Donnell as Gina
Ace Rosas as Stephon

Release
The film premiered virtually at the Denver Film Festival on October 22, 2020.

In May 2022, it was announced that Gravitas Ventures acquired worldwide distribution to the film, which was released in theaters and on VOD on November 25th, 2022.

Reception
Richard Roeper of the Chicago Sun-Times gave the film 3 out of 4 stars.

Liam Trump of Film Threat gave the film a 3 out of 10.

References

External links
 

2020 films
2020 comedy-drama films
American comedy-drama films
2020s English-language films
2020s American films